At least three ships of the French Navy have been named L'Alsacien or Alsacien:

 , a  seized by Germany while on slip and renamed TA3 she was launched in 1942 but never completed
 , a Type 39 torpedo boat launched as the German T23 in 1941 she was acquired by France in 1946 and renamed.  She was stricken in 1954.
 , a  launched in 1957 and stricken in 1981

French Navy ship names